Dynasties is an Australian factual television show, that looks at Australia's most famous and influential families. This observational documentary series began on the ABC in 2002.

Episodes

Series 1 - 2002
 Episode 1 | A Liberal Legacy
 Episode 2 | Quentin's Choice
 Episode 3 | The Wright Stuff
 Episode 4 | The Myers of Melbourne
 Episode 5 | Durack Dreaming
 Episode 6 | The De Bortolis Of Griffith

Series 2 -2003
 Episode 1 | Wentworth
 Episode 2 | Rose
 Episode 3 | Boyd
 Episode 4 | Marika
 Episode 5 | Kidman
 Episode 6 | Belgiorno-Nettis

Series 3 - 2004
 Episode 1 | The Street Family
 Episode 2 | The Clunies-Ross Family
 Episode 3 | The Ashton Family
 Episode 4 | The Frank Family
 Episode 5 | The Lee Family
 Episode 6 | The Anthony Family

Series 4 - 2005
 Episode 1 | Roycroft
 Episode 2 | Archer
 Episode 3 | Forrest
 Episode 4 | Donovan
 Episode 5 | Lea
 Episode 6 | Durack
 Episode 6 | Aarons
 Episode 7 | Jones
 Episode 8 | Mora

Series 5 - 2006
 Episode 1 | The Ansett Family
 Episode 2 | The Bullen Family
 Episode 3 | The McGuigan Family
 Episode 4 | The Hayes Family
 Episode 5 | The Zeccola Family
 Special | The Leahy Family

References

Australian Broadcasting Corporation original programming
Australian factual television series
2002 Australian television series debuts
English-language television shows